KPPM-LP is a Black Gospel formatted broadcast radio station licensed to and serving Lake Charles, Louisiana.  KPPM-LP is owned and operated by CCW Enterprises of Lake Charles.

References

External links
 KPPM 93.5FM Online
 

2014 establishments in Louisiana
Gospel radio stations in the United States
Radio stations established in 2014
Low-power FM radio stations in Louisiana
PPM-LP
Christian radio stations in Louisiana